Elisa Delaye-Fuchs (var. Fuchs, Delaye, Fuchs-Delaye) (1872–?) was a Swiss composer and a Professor of Harmony at the Conservatoire de Musique de Genève. Although prolific in her output she is very little known today.

Life 
She was married to the Russian-born Georges Delaye (1863–1949), a flutist, a composer and a professor at the Conservatoire de Musique de Genève.

Works

Organ
Op.21. Ave Maria 
Op.24. Jour de fête
Op.25. Pièce en La bémol majeur

Piano duet
Op.27. Impressions de voyage

Piano solo
Op.1. Berceuse et Gavotte
Op.3. Huit pièces pour piano 
Op.4/1. Suite No.1: Temps d'automn
Op.4/2. Suite No.2: Un, deux, trois
Op.5. Impromptu'
Op.8. Sonatine
Op.9. Sonate en la majeur
Op.10. Sonatine pour piano en ut majeur
Op.16. Sonatine en sol majeur
Op.30. Simple valse'
Op.33 Suite: A la montagne
Op. 45. Pour la jeunesse

Songs for solo voice
Op.11. Ritournelle
Op.15. Rondeau

Songs: for two voices
Op.2.  Adoration
Op.119. Canetons et poussin
Op1.121. Lapin et mésange
Op.122. Petite pomme rouge
Op.123. Le Club alpin des escargots 
Op.130. Quand les chats mangent du pain
Op.134. Oh! La bonne dinette'

Theoretical works
Op. 22. Cours de lecture rythmique.

External links
 Andrew Pink performs (2021) Pièce en La bémol majeur, op. 25

References

1872 births
19th-century Swiss musicians
20th-century women musicians
20th-century women composers
Swiss women composers
Composers for piano
Composers for pipe organ
Year of death missing
20th-century Swiss composers